Toll-like receptor 7, also known as TLR7, is a protein that in humans is encoded by the TLR7 gene.  Orthologs are found in mammals and birds. It is a member of the toll-like receptor (TLR) family and detects single stranded RNA.

Function 

The TLR family plays an important role in pathogen recognition and activation of innate immunity. TLRs are highly conserved from Drosophila to humans and share structural and functional similarities. They recognize pathogen-associated molecular patterns (PAMPs) that are expressed on infectious agents, and mediate the production of cytokines necessary for the development of effective immunity. The various TLRs exhibit different patterns of expression. This gene is predominantly expressed in lung, placenta, and spleen, and lies in close proximity to another family member, TLR8, on the human X chromosome.

TLR7 recognizes single-stranded RNA in endosomes, which is a common feature of viral genomes which are internalised by macrophages and dendritic cells. TLR7 recognizes single-stranded RNA of viruses such as HIV and HCV. TLR7 can recognize GU-rich single-stranded RNA. However, the presence of GU-rich sequences in the single-stranded RNA is not sufficient to stimulate TLR7.

Clinical significance 
TLR7 has been shown to play a significant role in the pathogenesis of autoimmune disorders such as lupus as well as in the regulation of antiviral immunity. Although not yet fully elucidated, using an unbiased genome-scale screen with short hairpin RNA (shRNA), it has been demonstrated that the receptor TREML4 acts as an essential positive regulator of TLR7 signaling. In TREML4 -/- mice macrophages that are hyporesponsive to TLR7 agonists, macrophages fail to produce type I interferons due to impaired phosphorylation of the transcription factor STAT1 by the mitogen-activated protein kinase p38 and decreased recruitment of the adaptor MYD88 to TLR7. TREML4 deficiency reduced the production of inflammatory cytokines and autoantibodies in MRL/lpr mice, suggesting that TLR7 is a vital component of antiviral immunity and a predecessor factor in the pathogenesis of rheumatic diseases such as systemic lupus erythematosus (SLE). A TLR7 agonist, imiquimod (Aldara), has been approved for topical use in treating warts caused by papillomavirus and for actinic keratosis.

Due to their ability to induce robust production of anti-cancer cytokines such as interleukin-12, TLR7 agonists have been investigated for cancer immunotherapy. Recent examples include TMX-202 delivery via liposomal formulation, as well as the delivery of resiquimod via nanoparticles formed from beta-cyclodextrin.

In July 2020, it was discovered that loss-of-function variants in TLR7 cause young men patients to become seriously ill after being infected by SARS-CoV-2. This suggests that TLR7 plays a key role in triggering the immune response for patients of COVID-19. For more details on the biological mechanism and pathway, see "Type I Interferon Induction and Signaling During SARS-CoV-2 Infection" on WikiPathways. In contrast, gain-of-function variation in TLR7 was shown in 2022 to cause systemic lupus erythematous and neuromyelitis optica in humans.

References

Further reading

External links 
 

7